Mutō (武藤 "warrior wisteria") is a Japanese surname.  It is also romanized as Muto, Mutoh or Mutou.

Mutou Valley - valley in the Flaming Mountains.

People
Adam Muto, American animator.
Akira Mutō, chief of staff of the 14th Area Army.
Ayami Mutō, singer.
Azumi Muto, actress.
, Japanese businesswoman.
Kaneyoshi Muto, Japanese fighter ace in World War II.
Hideki Mutoh, race car driver currently racing in the Super GT series.
Joe Muto, television producer.
Keiji Muto, pro-wrestler.
Masatoshi Muto, Japanese diplomat.
Nobuyoshi Mutō, general.
Toshiro Muto, Deputy Governor, Bank of Japan.
Yoshinori Muto, association football player.
, Japanese baseball player.
, Japanese footballer.
, Japanese footballer.

Fictional characters
Akio Mutou, science teacher in the visual novel Katawa Shoujo.
Ashirogi Muto of Bakuman.
Kaname Muto of Yahiko no Sakabato.
Kazuki Muto of Buso Renkin.
Kenji, Shizuka, and Yuki Muto of Lian Hearn's Tales of the Otori trilogy.
Nobuyushi Muto
Rikako Muto, female lead from the anime Ocean Waves.
Yugi and Sugoroku Mutou of Yu-Gi-Oh!.
MUTO, an acronym for "Massive Unidentified Terrestrial Organism", a species of kaiju featured in the 2014 film Godzilla.

Others
Mutoh Europe nv, electronics company.
Dr. Muto, video game.

See also
Japanese name

Japanese-language surnames